Mumtaz Askari Madhvani (born 31 July 1947) is an Indian actress. Primarily known for her work in Hindi films, she is the recipient of a Filmfare Award and the Filmfare Lifetime Achievement Award for her contributions to Hindi cinema.

Born into poverty in an urban slum in Mumbai, Mumtaz made her acting debut at age 11 with Sone Ki Chidiya (1958). Following smaller roles as a teenager in films like; Stree (1961), Sehra (1963), and Gehra Daag (1963), Mumtaz progressed to leading roles with a series of  action films opposite wrestler Dara Singh in films like; Faulad (1963) and Daku Mangal Singh (1966). However, her appearance in these films typecasted her as "Stunt Film Heroine" and her career stalled. Following praised supporting work in films;  Ram Aur Shyam (1967), Mere Hamdam Mere Dost (1968) and Brahmachari (1968), Mumtaz had her career breakthrough with Raj Khosla's family drama Do Raaste (1969). She went on to establish herself as one of the leading actresses of Hindi cinema with films; Bandhan (1969), Aadmi Aur Insaan  (1969), Sachaa Jhutha (1970), Khilona (1970), Tere Mere Sapne (1971), Hare Rama Hare Krishna (1971), Apna Desh (1972), Loafer (1973), Jheel Ke Us Paar  (1973), Chor Machaye Shor  (1974), Aap Ki Kasam (1974), Roti  (1974), Prem Kahani (1975) and Nagin (1976). Following her appearance in the drama Aaina (1977), Mumtaz took a sabbatical from acting for 13 years, making her comeback with Aandhiyan (1990), following which she retired from acting.

During her acting career, Mumtaz carved a niche and became known for her versatility and escaping typecasting, which initially had stalled her career in the first place. She became a prominent sex symbol during the 1970s and established herself as the highest paid woman in the Indian entertainment industry from the late 1960s to the mid-1970s. Since her retirement from acting, she has settled in London with her husband, Ugandan businessman Mayur Madhvani with whom she has two daughters. She has been an advocate for Breast Cancer survivors and has appeared in the documentary 1 a Minute (2010)

Early life
Mumtaz was born to Abdul Salim Askari (a dry fruits vendor) and Shadi Habib Agha who hailed from Mashhad, Iran. They got divorced just one year after she was born. Her younger sister is actor Mallika who was married to wrestler and Indian actor Randhawa - younger brother of wrestler and actor Dara Singh.

Career
Mumtaz appeared as a child actress in Sone Ki Chidiya (1958). As a teenager she acted as an extra in Vallah Kya Baat Hai, Stree and Sehra in the early 1960s. As an adult, her first role in A-grade films was that of the role of the sister of the hero in O. P. Ralhan's Gehra Daag. She got small roles in successful films such as Mujhe Jeene Do. Later, she got the role of the main lead heroine in 16 action films, including Faulad, Veer Bhimsen, Tarzan Comes to Delhi, Sikandar-E-Azam, Rustom-E-Hind, Raaka, and Daku Mangal Singh, with freestyle wrestler Dara Singh, and was labelled as a stunt-film heroine. In the films that Dara Singh and Mumtaz did together, Dara's remuneration was INR 450,000 per film, and Mumtaz's salary was INR 250,000 per film.

It took Raj Khosla's blockbuster Do Raaste (1969), starring Rajesh Khanna, to finally make Mumtaz a full-fledged star. Mumtaz had a decorative heroine's role and director Khosla had filmed four songs with her. The film made her popular, and she acknowledged that even though she had a small role, it was one of her most favourite films. Do Raaste and Bandhan, both with Rajesh Khanna, became top grossers of the year 1969, earning around 65 millions and 28 millions respectively. This was quickly followed by a heroine-oriented role in Khilona in 1970. She won the Filmfare Best Actress Award for Khilona and was "very happy that the audience accepted her in an emotional role". Her pairing with Rajesh Khanna was the most successful, with a total of 10 films. Mumtaz frequently acted with Feroz Khan and gave hits such as Mela (1971), Apradh (1972) and Nagin (1976). She acted opposite Dharmendra  in films such as Loafer and Jheel Ke Us Paar (1973). Shashi Kapoor, who had earlier refused Sachaa Jhutha opposite her because she was a "stunt-film heroine" acted with her in Chor Machaye Shor (1973).

Mumtaz quit films after Aaina (1977) to concentrate on her family. She made a comeback 13 years later with Aandhiyan but retired for good when the movie flopped.

Personal life
Mumtaz  married businessman Mayur Madhvani in 1974. They have two daughters, one of whom, Natasha, married  actor Feroz Khan's son Fardeen Khan in 2006. In the beginning of May 2022, Mumtaz was admitted to Mumbai’s Breach Candy Hospital after suffering a stomach infection and was discharged after a week. The veteran actress stated that she suffers from both Irritable Bowel Syndrome and Colitis and the sudden attack of diarrhea worsened things for her. Mumtaz was diagnosed with breast cancer at the age of 54. She reportedly underwent six chemotherapies and 35 radiation sessions before becoming cancer-free.

Relationships
Shammi Kapoor loved her and wanted to marry her too but Mumtaz was not ready to leave her film  career at her early age as Kapoor didn't want his wife to work in the film industry after getting married.

Filmography
{| class="wikitable sortable"
|-
! Year 
! Title 
! Role !! Notes
|-
| 1961 
| Stree 
| ||
|-
| 1962 
| Vallah Kya Baat Hai 
| Mala ||
|-
| rowspan="5" | 1963 
| Sehra 
| Juhi ||
|-
| Rustom Sohrab 
| Shehroo ||
|-
| Mujhe Jeene Do 
| Farida ||
|-
| Gehra Daag 
| Asha ||
|-
| Faulad 
| Rajkumari Padma ||
|-
| rowspan="6" | 1964 
| Veer Bhimsen 
| ||
|-
| Samson
| Princess Shera ||
|-
| Qawwali Ki Raat 
| ||
|-
| Hercules
| ||
|-
| Baaghi 
| ||
|-
| Aandhi Aur Toofan 
| ||
|-
| rowspan="14" | 1965 
| Tarzan Comes to Delhi
| Rekha ||
|-
| Tarzan and King Kong
| ||
|-
| Son of Hatimtai 
| ||
|-
| Sikandar-e-Azam 
| Cynthia ||
|-
| Rustom-E-Hind 
| ||
|-
| Raaka 
| ||
|-
| Mere Sanam 
| Kamini (Kamo) ||
|-
| Khandan 
| Neelima ||
|-
| Kaajal 
| Jharna ||
|-
| Jadui Angoothi 
| ||
|-
| Hum Diwane 
| ||
|-
| Do Dil 
| Albeli ||
|-
| Boxer 
| ||
|-
| Bahu Beti 
| Savitri ||
|-
| rowspan="12" | 1966
| Pyas
| Sudha ||
|-
| Yeh Raat Phir Na Aayegi 
| Reeta ||
|-
| Sawan Ki Ghata 
| Saloni ||
|-
| Saaz Aur Awaaz 
| ||
|-
| Rustom Kaun 
| ||
|-
| Pyar Kiye Jaa 
| Meena Priyadarshini ||
|-
| Pati Patni 
| Kala ||
|-
| Ladka Ladki 
| Asha ||
|-
| Jawan Mard 
| ||
|-
| Daku Mangal Singh 
| Princess Aruna ||
|-
| Daadi Maa 
| Seema ||
|-
| Suraj 
| Kalavati ||
|-
| rowspan="10" | 1967 
| Woh Koi Aur Hoga 
| Seema ||
|-
| Ram Aur Shyam 
| Shanta ||
|-
| Patthar Ke Sanam 
| Meena ||
|-
| Hamraaz 
| Shabnam ||
|-
| Do Dushman 
| ||
|-
| CID 909 
| Reshma ||
|-
| Chandan Ka Palna 
| Sadhana ||
|-
| Boond Jo Ban Gayee Moti 
| Shefali ||
|-
| Baghdad Ki Raatein 
| ||
|-
| Aag
| Paro ||
|-
| rowspan="7" | 1968 
| Mere Hamdam Mere Dost 
| Meena ||
|-
| Md Mojahid Alam 
| ||
|-
| Jahan Mile Dharti Akash 
| ||
|-
| Golden Eyes Secret Agent 077 
| ||
|-
| Gauri 
| Geeta ||
|-
| Brahmachari 
| Roopa Sharma ||
|-
| Apna Ghar Apni Kahani 
| ||
|-
| rowspan="8" | 1969 
| Shart 
| Sapna Singh ||
|-
| Mera Yaar Mera Dushman 
| ||
|-
| Mera Dost 
| ||
|-
| Jigri Dost 
| Shobha Das ||
|-
| Do Raaste 
| Reena ||
|-
| Bandhan 
| Gauri Malikram ||
|-
| Apna Khoon Apna Dushman 
| ||
|-
| Aadmi Aur Insaan 
| Rita ||
|-
| rowspan="8" | 1970 
| Sachaa Jhutha 
| Meena/Rita ||
|-
| Pardesi 
| Myna ||
|-
| Khilona 
| Chand ||
|-
| Humjoli 
| Meena || Guest appearance
|-
| Himmat 
| Malti ||
|-
| Ek Nanhi Munni Ladki Thi 
| ||
|-
| Bhai Bhai 
| Bijli ||
|-
| Maa Aur Mamta 
| Mary ||
|-
| rowspan="9" | 1971 
| Mela 
| Laajo ||
|-
| Ladki Pasand Hai 
| ||
|-
| Kathputli 
| Nisha ||
|-
| Ek Nari Ek Brahmachari 
| Meena ||
|-
| Chaahat 
| Sheela ||
|-
| Upaasna 
| Shalu (also Kiran) ||
|-
| Tere Mere Sapne 
| Nisha Patel/Nisha Kumar ||
|-
| Hare Rama Hare Krishna 
| Shanti ||
|-
| Dushman 
| Phoolmati ||
|-
| rowspan="8" | 1972 
| Tangewala 
| Paro/Chandika ||
|-
| Shararat 
| Radha/Meeta ||
|-
| Pyaar Diwana 
| Mamta ||
|-
| Gomti Ke Kinare 
| Roshni ||
|-
| Dharkan 
| Rekha Prasad ||
|-
| Apradh 
| Meena/Rita ||
|-
| Apna Desh 
| Chanda/Madame Popololita ||
|-
| Roop Tera Mastana 
| Princess Usha/Kiran || Double role
|-
| rowspan="4" | 1973 
| Pyaar Ka Rishta 
| ||
|-
| Bandhe Haath 
| Mala ||
|-
| Loafer 
| Anju ||
|-
| Jheel Ke Us Paar 
| Neelu ||
|-
| rowspan="3" | 1974 
| Chor Machaye Shor 
| Rekha ||
|-
| Aap Ki Kasam 
| Sunita ||
|-
| Roti 
| Bijli ||
|-
| rowspan="3" | 1975 
| Prem Kahani 
| Kamini ||
|-
| Lafange 
| Sapna ||
|-
| Aag Aur Toofan 
| ||
|-
| 1976 
| Nagin 
| Rajkumari ||
|-
| 1977 
| Aaina 
| Shalini ||
|-
| 1990 
| Aandhiyan 
| Shakuntala ||
|-
| 2010 
| 1 a Minute 
| Herself || Docudrama film
|}

Awards
Mumtaz won the Filmfare Award for Best Actress for Khilona in 1970. Actually, no one was interested in accepting the role of "Chaand" for Khilona, just because she was a prostitute in the storyline. But with that role Mumtaz bagged her only Filmfare Award.

During her career, she was awarded with one Filmfare Award for Best Actress, out of three nominations, and one BFJA Award for Best Supporting Actress.

Won
BFJA Award for Best Supporting Actress – Brahmachari (1968)
Filmfare Award for Best Actress – Khilona (1970)
Filmfare Lifetime Achievement Award (1996)
IIFA Outstanding Contribution by an Indian in Cinema, Honorary Award (2008)

Nominated
Filmfare Award for Best Supporting Actress – Ram Aur Shyam (1967)
Filmfare Award for Best Supporting Actress – Aadmi Aur Insaan'' (1969)

References

External links

 
 Profile of Mumtaz's career
 Mumtaz

Living people
1947 births
20th-century Indian actresses
Actresses in Hindi cinema
Indian film actresses
People from Jamshedpur
Actresses from Jharkhand
British actresses of Indian descent
Filmfare Awards winners
Filmfare Lifetime Achievement Award winners